North East Shuttles was an Indian charter airline based in the city of Kolkata, West Bengal. It was founded in 2006 and began operations in 2011 with two aircraft to serve regional routes in the North East, West Bengal and Jharkhand. The airline had planned to expand to Uttar Pradesh, but operations never began. By July 2019, the airline had ceased operations.

Destinations
North East Shuttles is non-operational.

Fleet
North East Shuttles operated the following aircraft:

Accidents and incidents

On 4 May 2011, a Cessna Grand Caravan of the airline overshot the runway at Lengpui airport during landing in foggy weather. No passengers or crew members were injured and the aircraft was later repaired and returned to service.

Sponsorship
In July 2018 it was announced that North East Shuttles had agreed to become the co-sponsor of National Club of India Mohun Bagan. The sponsorship deal was worth a sum of ₹ 30 million (₹ 3 crore).

References

Airlines of India
Airlines established in 2006
Companies based in Kolkata
Indian companies established in 2006
2006 establishments in West Bengal